Carlos Hasselbaink (born 13 December 1968) is a Dutch former professional footballer who played as a striker for several clubs, including AZ Alkmaar, Telstar, VVV-Venlo, FC Utrecht and HFC Haarlem, before retiring in 2005. He is the older brother of former Chelsea and Middlesbrough striker Jimmy Floyd Hasselbaink.

References

1968 births
Living people
Surinamese emigrants to the Netherlands
Sportspeople from Paramaribo
Dutch footballers
Association football forwards
AZ Alkmaar players
SC Telstar players
VVV-Venlo players
FC Utrecht players
HFC Haarlem players